Numbered Account (1969–1996) was an American Thoroughbred racehorse who was voted the American Champion Two-Year-Old Filly of 1971. She was bred and raced by Ogden Phipps and trained by Roger Laurin.

On May 19, 1971, Numbered Account set a Fashion Stakes record of 0:57 2/5 for five furlongs on dirt at Aqueduct Racetrack. On October 22, 1972, in winning the Spinster Stakes she equaled the Keeneland track record of 1:47 2/5 for 1 1/8 miles (9 furlongs) on dirt set by Round Table in 1957.

Numbered Account retired in 1974 after three years in racing having won fourteen of her twenty-two starts and $607,048. She was sent to broodmare duty at Claiborne Farm near Paris, Kentucky. Of her best foals, she was the dam of Grade 1 winners Dance Number (by Northern Dancer) and Private Account (by Damascus) who sired Personal Ensign.  She also appears twice in the pedigree of 2014 Kentucky Derby winner California Chrome.

References

External links
 Numbered Account's pedigree and partial racing stats

1969 racehorse births
1996 racehorse deaths
Racehorses bred in Kentucky
Racehorses trained in the United States
Eclipse Award winners
Phipps family
Thoroughbred family 1-x